Raúl Rafael Labrador (born December 8, 1967) is an American lawyer and politician from Idaho, currently the state's attorney general. He also represented the 14B district in the state legislature from 2006 to 2010.

Labrador sought his party's nomination for governor in the 2018 election, opting not to seek another term in Congress to focus on his campaign; he finished second in the Republican primary to Lieutenant Governor Brad Little, who went on to win the election. Labrador sought the nomination for the state attorney general in the 2022 election, defeating longtime incumbent Lawrence Wasden for the Republican nomination and Democratic nominee Tom Arkoosh in the general election.

Early life and education
Born on December 8, 1967, in Carolina, Puerto Rico, Labrador relocated to Las Vegas, Nevada, as a child and graduated from Las Vegas High School in 1985. He was raised by a single mother who struggled financially.

He attended Brigham Young University in Provo, Utah, and spent two years as a missionary for the Church of Jesus Christ of Latter-day Saints in Santiago Chile from 1987 to 1989. Labrador returned to BYU and received a Bachelor of Arts degree in Spanish in 1992 with an emphasis in Latin American literature. He was admitted to the University of Washington School of Law in Seattle and received his Juris Doctor in 1995.

Early career 
Married in 1991, Labrador relocated to his wife's home state of Idaho and practiced law and immigration law in private practice from 1995 until his election to the state legislature in 2006.

Idaho House of Representatives

2006 
Labrador ran for and won the Republican nomination for Idaho House Seat B against two other challengers. He won the general election with 65.55% against Daniel S. Weston.

2008 
He was unopposed in the May 2008 Republican primary. Labrador defeated Glida Bothwell in the general election, winning 69.1% of the vote.

Committee assignments 
Labrador served on the Environment, Energy, and Technology Committee in 2007, Judiciary, Rules, and Administration Committee from 2007 to 2010, the State Affairs Committee from 2007 to 2010, and the Transportation and Defense Committee from 2009 to 2010.

U.S. House of Representatives

Elections

2010 

In 2010, Labrador defeated Vaughn Ward in the Republican primary 48%–39% on May 10, in what was widely considered a major upset. In the general election, Labrador defeated first-term Democratic incumbent Walt Minnick 51%–41%.

2012 

Labrador supported Mitt Romney for president.

2014 

On August 14, 2013, Labrador decided not to challenge incumbent Idaho Governor Butch Otter in the Republican primary, instead running for reelection to Congress for a third term.

On August 19, 2013, Democratic State Representative Shirley Ringo decided to challenge Labrador instead of running for an eighth term in the Idaho state legislature.

Labrador announced on June 13 that he would challenge Majority Whip Kevin McCarthy for the leadership position; in a vote held June 19, 2014 the House selected McCarthy.

Labrador won both the Republican primary (78.6%) and the general election (65%).

2016

A supporter of Donald Trump in the 2016 election, Labrador won the Republican primary (81%) in May, and the general election (68.2%) in November.

Tenure
Town halls
Labrador was one of the few Republicans to host a town hall after the election of Donald Trump and the only member of the state's congressional delegation to host one.

Committee assignments
 Committee on Natural Resources
 Federal Lands
 Oversight and Investigations- Chair 
 Committee on the Judiciary
 Subcommittee on Immigration and Border Security- Vice Chair 
 Crime, Terrorism, Homeland Security, and Investigations

Caucus memberships
 Liberty Caucus
 Freedom Caucus
 Congressional Western Caucus

Political positions

Domestic issues

Health care
On April 20, 2017 Labrador said he does not believe healthcare is a human right. Labrador supports the full repeal of the Affordable Care Act because he believes it will raise costs and eliminate jobs.

Labrador supports requiring those illegally residing in the United States to be responsible for their own healthcare costs.

He voted for the American Health Care Act of 2017, which passed the House May 4, 2017. One of the few Republican lawmakers who hosted a town hall after this vote, Labrador received national attention for stating during the meeting at Lewis-Clark State College that "Nobody dies because they don't have access to healthcare." The statement caused a huge outcry from the audience present and on social media for several days.

Economic issues

Elections 
Labrador has stated that he supports the repeal of the 17th Amendment to the U.S. Constitution which provides for the direct election of members of the U.S. Senate by the voters in each state. Before the amendment was ratified in 1913, Senators were selected by the legislatures of their respective states. With regard to this position, Labrador has stated "I have a consistent philosophy about government and the importance of states' rights."

Tax reform 
Labrador is in favor of tax reform, specifically reform that rids of loopholes, lowers "overall rates," and reduces government spending so the national debt does not increase.

Labrador voted in favor of the Tax Cuts and Jobs Act of 2017. He says the bill will "allow hard-working Idahoans to keep more of their money," including helping them "meet their expenses and make crucial investments."

International issues

Energy & oil 
Labrador is seen by many in eastern Idaho, which is not in his congressional district, as an opponent of the Idaho National Laboratory (INL).

Immigration 

On the July 6, 2014, episode of Meet the Press, Labrador stated that the Obama administration needed to "immediately deport" young illegal immigrants. The comment came as part of a discussion about the estimated 52,000 unaccompanied minors from Central America who had tried to cross the border since October 2013.

Labrador was a member of the "Gang of Eight," a bipartisan group of House members working on immigration reform legislation, but on June 5, 2013, he left the negotiations because he wanted language in the bill requiring that illegal immigrants be responsible for their own health care costs. Labrador said he would use his position on the House Judiciary Committee to pass immigration reform legislation.

Social issues

Abortion 
Labrador opposes late termination of pregnancy and believes "life begins at conception" and that "The unborn child is still a child – made in the image of God, who will one day have the same hopes and dreams as the rest of us. The fact that life begins at conception might be an uncomfortable truth for some. But it's a truth, all the same."

Labrador voted in favor of the Pain-Capable Unborn Child Protection Act in 2017.

Family Rights
Idaho is one of the states that has faith-healing exemption. In a debate, Labrador said he would not change it.

Cannabis
Labrador has a "B" rating from NORML for his voting history regarding cannabis-related causes. Labrador is in favor of veterans having access to medical marijuana if recommended by their Veterans Health Administration doctor and if it is legal for medicinal purposes in their state of residence. He also supports industrial hemp farming.

LGBT issues
In June 2015, Labrador introduced HR 2802, titled the "First Amendment Defense Act" (FADA) which was said to protect those who oppose same-sex marriage based on their religious beliefs from action by the federal government. Critics, such as Ian Thompson of the American Civil Liberties Union claimed that the bill would "open the door to unprecedented taxpayer-funded discrimination against LGBT people, single mothers, and unmarried couples."

Elections

2018 gubernatorial campaign 

On May 9, 2017, Labrador filed to run in the 2018 Idaho gubernatorial race, and embarked on a kick-off tour several weeks later with stops in Boise, Post Falls, and Idaho Falls. He was not able to run for his current congressional seat and governor at the same time; leaving CD-1 an open seat in 2018.

In November 2017, Senator Ted Cruz of Texas endorsed Labrador.

Labrador placed second in the Republican gubernatorial primary to Lieutenant Governor Brad Little, winning 32.6% of the vote.

Idaho Republican Party (2019–2020)
In June 2019, Labrador announced that he would run for chairman of the Idaho Republican Party at its next State Central Committee meeting, having already received the backing and support of most IDGOP officers.

On June 29, 2019, Labrador won Idaho Republican Party Chair by two votes, defeating former Superintendent of Education Tom Luna. A year later in June 2020, Labrador resigned from his position as party chair and joined a local law firm; he was succeeded by Luna.

Idaho attorney general

2022 election 

Labrador filed as a candidate in the 2022 Idaho attorney general election on November 17, 2021. He challenged 20-year incumbent Lawrence Wasden for the Republican nomination; in the primary on May 17, Labrador won with 51.6% of the vote.

In the general election on November 8, he received 62.6% of the vote to easily defeat Democrat Tom Arkoosh.

Tenure 
Labrador was sworn in as Idaho's attorney general on January 2, 2023. Four days later, he filed a motion to dismiss charges against Sara Walton Brady, a Meridian woman who was arrested in 2020 for trespassing during the COVID-19 lockdown.

Personal life 
Labrador lives in Eagle with his wife Rebecca and their five children; he is a member of the Church of Jesus Christ of Latter-day Saints.

See also
List of Hispanic and Latino Americans in the United States Congress

References

External links

 
 
 

|-

|-

|-

|-

|-

1967 births
2020 United States presidential electors
21st-century American politicians
American Mormon missionaries in Chile
American politicians of Puerto Rican descent
Brigham Young University alumni
Hispanic and Latino American members of the United States Congress
Idaho Attorneys General
Las Vegas High School alumni
Latter Day Saints from Idaho
Latter Day Saints from Nevada
Living people
Republican Party members of the Idaho House of Representatives
People from Carolina, Puerto Rico
People from Eagle, Idaho
Puerto Rican Latter Day Saints
Republican Party members of the United States House of Representatives from Idaho
State political party chairs of Idaho
University of Washington School of Law alumni